Uch Ven is a Cambodian communist and former member of the national assembly of Cambodia.

References

Living people
Year of birth missing (living people)
Cambodian politicians
Cambodian communists